Tarasankar Bandyopadhyay (23 July 1898 – 14 September 1971) was an Indian novelist who wrote in the Bengali language. He wrote 65 novels, 53-story-books, 12 plays, 4 essay-books, 4 autobiographies, 2 travel stories and composed several songs. He was awarded Rabindra Puraskar, Sahitya Akademi Award, Jnanpith Award, Padma Shri and Padma Bhushan. He was nominated for Nobel Prize in Literature in 1971 and posthumously nominated in 1972.

Biography
Bandyopadhyay was born at his ancestral home at Labhpur village in Birbhum district, Bengal Province, British India (now West Bengal, India) to Haridas Bandyopadhyay and Prabhabati Devi.

He passed the Matriculation examination from Labhpur Jadablal H. E. School in 1916 and was later admitted first to St. Xavier's College, Calcutta and then to South Suburban College (now Asutosh College). While studying in intermediate at St. Xavier's College, he joined the non-co-operation movement. He could not complete his university course due to ill health and political activism. During these college years, he was also associated with a radical militant youth group and was arrested and interned in his village.

He was arrested in 1930 for actively supporting the Indian independence movement, but released later that year. After that he decided to devote himself to literature. In 1932, he met Rabindranath Tagore at Santiniketan for the first time. His first novel Chaitali Ghurni was published on the same year.

In 1940, he rented a house at Bagbazar and brought his family to Calcutta. In 1941, he moved to Baranagar. In 1942, he presided over the Birbhum District Literature Conference and became the president of the Anti-Fascist Writers and Artists Association in Bengal. In 1944, he presided over the Kanpur Bengali Literature Conference arranged by the non-resident Bengalis living there. In 1947, he inaugurated Prabasi Banga Sahitya Sammelan held in Calcutta; presided over the Silver Jubilee Prabasi Banga Sahitya Sammelan in Bombay; and received Sarat Memorial Medal from the University of Calcutta. In 1948, he moved to his own house at Tala Park, Calcutta.

In 1952, he was nominated to be a member of the legislative assembly. He was a member of the West Bengal Vidhan Parishad between 1952–60. In 1954, he took Diksha from his mother. In 1955, he was awarded the Rabindra Puraskar by the Government of West Bengal. In 1956, he received the Sahitya Akademi Award. In 1957 he visited Soviet Union to join the preparatory committee of the Afro-Asian Writers' Association and later went to Tashkent at an invitation from the Chinese Government as the leader of the Indian Writers delegation at the Afro-Asian Writers' Association.

In 1959, he received the Jagattarini Gold Medal from the University of Calcutta, and presided over All India Writer's Conference in Madras. In 1960, he retired from the West Bengal Legislative Assembly but was nominated to the Parliament by the President of India. He was a member of Rajya Sabha between 1960–66. In 1962, he received Padma Shri; but the death of his son-in-law broke his heart and to keep himself diverted he took to painting and making wooden toys. In 1963, he received Sisirkumar Award. In 1966, he retired from the Parliament and presided over Nagpur Bengali Literature Conference. In 1966, he won the Jnanpith Award and in 1969, he received Padma Bhushan and was honoured with the title of Doctor of Literature by the University of Calcutta and the Jadavpur University. In 1969, he was given the fellowship of Sahitya Akademi, in 1970 became the president of Bangiya Sahitya Parishad/Vangiya Sahitya Parishad. In 1971, he gave the Nripendrachandra Memorial Lecture at Visva-Bharati University and D. L. Roy Memorial Lecture at the University of Calcutta.

Bandyopadhyay died at his Calcutta residence early in the morning on 14 September 1971. His last rites were performed at the Nimtala Cremation Ground, North Calcutta.

In 2021, Bandhopadhyay's ancestral home in Labhpur was converted into a museum in his memory by local residents as well as his family. It archives several personal artifacts, and photographs.

Family members and relatives
Tarasankar Bandyopadhyay was married to Umashashi Devi in 1916. Their eldest son Sanatkumar Bandyopadhyay was born in 1918; the youngest son Saritkumar Bandyopadhyay was born in 1922; the eldest daughter Ganga was born in 1924; the second daughter Bulu was born in 1926 but died in 1932; the youngest daughter Bani was born in 1932.

Awards
 1955 - Rabindra Puraskar for his novel Arogya Niketan
 1956 - Sahitya Akademi Award
 1966 - Jnanpith Award for his novel Ganadebata.
 1962 - Padma Shri
 1969 - Padma Bhushan
 ---- - Sharat Smriti Puraskar 
 ---- - Jagattarini Gold Medal from the Calcutta University

Bibliography

Poetry
Tripatra (1926)

Novels

Short story collections

Drama

Farce
Chakmaki (1945)

Discography
List of all songs for which Lyrics were composed by Tarasankar Bandyopadhyay

References

External links
   
 

1898 births
1971 deaths
Indian novelists
Indian dramatists and playwrights
Indian essayists
Indian autobiographers
Indian memoirists
Indian travel writers
Indian composers
Indian lyricists
Indian poets
Indian short story writers
Indian male novelists
Indian male short story writers
Indian male dramatists and playwrights
Indian male essayists
Indian male composers
Indian male poets
Indian male writers
Indian male film score composers
Asutosh College alumni
University of Calcutta alumni
Bengali Hindus
20th-century Bengalis
Bengali novelists
Bengali-language writers
Bengali poets
Bengali-language lyricists
People from Birbhum district
Recipients of the Rabindra Puraskar
Recipients of the Padma Shri in literature & education
Recipients of the Padma Bhushan in literature & education
Nominated members of the Rajya Sabha
Recipients of the Sahitya Akademi Award in Bengali
Recipients of the Jnanpith Award
Recipients of the Sahitya Akademi Fellowship
20th-century Indian novelists
20th-century Indian short story writers
20th-century Indian poets
20th-century Indian dramatists and playwrights
20th-century Indian male writers
20th-century Indian writers
20th-century essayists
20th-century Indian composers
Poets from West Bengal
Novelists from West Bengal
Dramatists and playwrights from West Bengal
Writers from Kolkata
People from West Bengal